Ney-anbān (numerous Latin spellings), is a type of bagpipe which is popular in southern Iran, especially around Bushehr. The term ney-anban literally means "bag pipe", but more specifically can refer to a  type of droneless double-chantered bagpipes played in Southern Iran.  This is similar to the Bahrainian jirba played by ethnic Iranians in the Persian Gulf islands.

In Bushehr, the ney-anban is used to accompany sarva, the singing of free-metre couplets.

Orthography
Latin spelling of the name of this pipe include: ney-hanbān, ney-anbun, ney ammbooni, nai-ambana hanbun, hanbuneh, nay-anban.

External links
Ney-anbān, video by Saeid Shanbezadeh

References

Persian musical instruments
Persian Gulf musical instruments
Iranian inventions
Bagpipes